is a Japanese actor, voice actor and singer from Tokyo, Japan.

Biography

He won the Merit Award at the 14th Seiyu Awards.

Filmography

Television animation
Professor Shikishima ("Dr. Bob Brilliant") in Tetsujin 28-go ("Gigantor") (1963)
Grandpa in Mokku of the Oak Tree (1972)
Silas in The Adventures of Tom Sawyer (1980)
Keishichi Hayashi in Ashita no Joe 2 (1980)
Hanae Ichinose's husband in Maison Ikkoku (1986)
Baikin-sennin in Soreike! Anpanman (1989)
Hemulen in Moomin (1990)
Hosoda in Rumiko Takahashi Anthology (2003)

Theatrical animation
Niga in Nausicaä of the Valley of the Wind (1984)
Baikin-sennin in Go! Anpanman: Baikinman's Counterattack (1990)
Old Man in Porco Rosso (1992)
Hemulen in Comet in Moominland (1992)
Old Man in Doraemon: Nobita and the Spiral City (1997)

Dubbing
Juror #2 (John Fiedler) in 12 Angry Men (1957, dub in 1974)
Dragon (Thayer David) in The Eiger Sanction (1975, dub in 1978)

References

External links
 Official agency profile 
 

1931 births
Living people
Japanese male child actors
Japanese male video game actors
Japanese male voice actors
Male voice actors from Tokyo